"Round Here Buzz" is a song co-written and recorded by American country music artist Eric Church. It was released in April 2017 as the fourth single from his 2015 album Mr. Misunderstood. Church wrote this song with Luke Dick and Jeff Hyde. The song went Platinum as of December 6, 2018.

Content
The song is a male narrator who is "stuck in his hometown as his ex goes off to chase her dreams". Church said that co-writer Luke Dick was "nervous" because the song had already been partially written, and was subject to "tweaking" from Church when Church presented the other two writers with the idea that he had.

Commercial performance
The song has sold 216,000 copies in the United States as of February 2018.  It was certified Platinum by the RIAA on December 6, 2018 for a million units in sales and streams.

Music video
The music video centers around the male narrator, with Christian Sancho (the bassist in Ashley McBryde's band Deadhorse) starring.

Chart performance

Weekly charts

Year-end charts

Certifications

References

2015 songs
2017 singles
Eric Church songs
Songs written by Eric Church
Songs written by Jeff Hyde
EMI Records singles
Song recordings produced by Jay Joyce
Songs written by Luke Dick